White Sulphur Springs is an unincorporated community in Meriwether County, in the U.S. state of Georgia.

History
A post office called White Sulphur Springs was established in 1841, and remained in operation until 1919. The community was named for a mineral spring near the original town site. A variant name is "Brandywine Station".

The Georgia General Assembly incorporated White Sulphur Springs as a town in 1907. The town's municipal charter was repealed in 1995.

References

Former municipalities in Georgia (U.S. state)
Unincorporated communities in Georgia (U.S. state)
Unincorporated communities in Meriwether County, Georgia
Populated places disestablished in 1995